Space Power Facility (SPF) is a NASA facility used to test spaceflight hardware under simulated launch and spaceflight conditions. The SPF is part of NASA's Neil A. Armstrong Test Facility, which in turn is part of the Glenn Research Center. The Neil A. Armstrong Test Facility and the SPF are located near Sandusky, Ohio (Oxford Township, Erie County, Ohio).

The SPF is able to simulate a spacecraft's launch environment, as well as in-space environments. NASA has developed these capabilities under one roof to optimize testing of spaceflight hardware while minimizing transportation issues. Space Power Facility has become a "One Stop Shop" to qualify flight hardware for crewed space flight. This facility provides the capability to perform the following environmental testing:
 Thermal-vacuum testing
 Reverberation acoustic testing
 Mechanical vibration testing
 Modal testing
 Electromagnetic interference and compatibility testing

Thermal-Vacuum Test Chamber
The Space Power Facility (SPF) is a vacuum chamber built by NASA in 1969. It is the world's largest thermal vacuum chamber. It was originally commissioned for nuclear-electric power studies under vacuum conditions, but was later decommissioned. It was subsequently recommissioned for use in testing spacecraft propulsion systems. Recent uses include testing the airbag landing systems for the Mars Pathfinder and the Mars Exploration Rovers, Spirit and Opportunity, under simulated Mars atmospheric conditions.

The facility was designed and constructed to test both nuclear and non-nuclear space hardware in a simulated Low-Earth-Orbiting environment. Although the facility was designed for testing nuclear hardware, only non-nuclear tests have been performed throughout its history. Some of the test programs that have been performed at the facility include high-energy experiments, rocket-fairing separation tests, Mars Lander system tests, deployable Solar Sail tests and International Space Station hardware tests. 

The facility can sustain a high vacuum (10−6 torr, 130 μPa); simulate solar radiation via a 4 MW quartz heat lamp array, solar spectrum by a 400 kW arc lamp, and cold environments with a variable geometry cryogenic cold shroud.

The facility is available on a full-cost reimbursable basis to government, universities, and the private sector.

Aluminum Test Chamber
This material was selected because of its low neutron absorption cross-section. The chamber floor was designed for a load of 300 tons.

Concrete Chamber Enclosure
The space between the concrete enclosure and the aluminum test chamber is pumped down to a pressure of  during a test.

Brian Cox of the BBC's Human Universe filmed a rock and feather drop episode at the Space Power Facility.  Below is a YouTube clip:
Rock and Feather Drop at NASA's Space Power Facility

Electromagnetic Interference/Compatibility (EMI/EMC) functionality
Designed specifically as a large-scale thermal-vacuum test chamber for qualification testing of vehicles and equipment in outer-space conditions, it was discovered in the late 2000s that the unique construction of the SPF interior aluminum vacuum chamber also makes it an extremely large and electrically complex RF cavity with excellent reverberant RF characteristics. In 2009 these characteristics were measured by NIST and others after which the facility was understood to be, not only the world's largest Vacuum chamber, but also the world's largest EMI/EMC test facility. In 2011 NASA GRC successfully performed a calibration of the aluminum vacuum chamber using IEC 61000-4-21 methodologies. As a result of these activities, the SPF is capable of performing radiated susceptibility EMI tests for vehicles and equipment per MIL-STD-461 and able to achieve MIL-STD-461F limits above approximately 80 MHz. In the spring of 2017 the low-power characterizations and calibrations from 2009 and 2011 were proven correct in a series of high-power tests performed in the chamber to validate its capabilities. The SPF chamber is currently being prepared for EMI radiated susceptibility testing of the crew module for the Artemis 1 of NASA's Orion spacecraft.

Reverberant Acoustic Test Facility
The Reverberant Acoustic Test Facility has 36 nitrogen-driven horns to simulate the high noise levels that will be experienced during a space vehicle launch and supersonic ascent conditions. The RATF is capable of an overall sound pressure level of 163 dB within a  chamber.

Mechanical Vibration Test Facility

The Mechanical Vibration Test Facility (MVF), is a three-axis vibration system. It will apply vibration in each of the three orthogonal axes (not simultaneously) with one direction in parallel to the Earth-launch thrust axis (X) at 5–150 Hz, 0-1.25 g-pk vertical, and 5–150 Hz 0-1.0 g-pk for the horizontal axes. 
The 16 vertical actuators allow for testing of up to a  article at the previously stated frequency and amplitude limits.
Horizontal shaking is accomplished through use of 4 TEAM Corporation Horizontal Actuators. The horizontal actuators are used during Vertical testing to counteract cross axis forces and overturning moments.

NASA's Space Power Facility Vibro-Acoustic Construction

Modal Test Facility

In addition to the sine vibe table, a fixed-base Modal floor sufficient for the  diameter test article is available.

Assembly Area
The SPF Facility layout is ideal for performing multiple test programs. The facility has two large high bay areas adjacent to either side of the vacuum chamber. The advantage of having both areas available is that it allows for two complex tests to be prepared simultaneously. One test can be prepared in a high bay while another test is being conducted in the vacuum chamber. Large chamber doors provide access to the test chamber from either high bay.

NASA's Space Power Facility Vibro-Acoustic Construction

References

External links

 Skylab Shroud in Plum Brook Space Power Facility
 NASA image gallery, featuring the SPF
 Detailed facility capabilities

Aerospace engineering
Glenn Research Center
NASA facilities
Buildings and structures in Erie County, Ohio